Parisian Nights is a 1925 American silent drama film directed by Alfred Santell and featuring Boris Karloff.

Plot
As described in a film magazine review, Adela, a wealthy sculptress, finds in Jean, a leader of a Parisian Apaches, the model for which she has been looking when he comes to rob her house. He poses for her and incurs the jealousy of Marie, his underworld sweetheart. A rival faction of  the Apaches kills Jacques, Jean’s friend, and a terrific battle between the two factions ensues, in which Marie is killed. Adele finds happiness with Jean, who promises to reform.

Cast

Preservation
A print of Parisian Nights exists at the Cinematheque Royale de Belgique.

See also
 Boris Karloff filmography

References

External links

1925 films
1925 drama films
Silent American drama films
American silent feature films
American black-and-white films
Films directed by Alfred Santell
Film Booking Offices of America films
Films set in Paris
1920s American films